Paul Wood is a British journalist. He is the World Affairs correspondent for the BBC. He was previously the defence and Middle East correspondent.

Early life
Paul Wood graduated from the London School of Economics, where he received a bachelor's degree in political science.

Career
Wood reported from Afghanistan, Croatia, Bosnia, and Macedonia, Chechnya, Algeria, Libya, Saudi Arabia, and Sudan, including Darfur. In August 2011, he was in Libya, covering the advance of the protestors’ troops against Gaddafi. He was in Baghdad during the 2003 invasion of Iraq and in Fallujah during the 2004 battle for the city. In 2004 he covered the devastating suicide bombings on pilgrims in Karbala. He was previously the BBC’s Belgrade reporter, filing stories from behind Serbian lines while travelling with Kosovar guerrillas during the NATO bombing campaign in June 1999. In February 2012, he covered the fighting in the Syrian Civil War, reporting from the outskirts of the city of Homs with rebel fighters.

In 2004 his Iraq War coverage won both the television prize at the Bayeux-Calvados Awards for war correspondents and a Golden Nymph Award at the Monte Carlo television festival. He received the Cutting Edge Award 2012 at the eighth International Media Awards.

References

Year of birth missing (living people)
Living people
Alumni of the London School of Economics
BBC newsreaders and journalists
British television journalists